All Your Dead Ones is a 2011 Colombian drama film directed by Carlos Moreno. The film won an award for cinematography at the 2011 Sundance Film Festival.

Cast
 John Alex Castillo
 Harold Devasten
 Jorge Herrera
 Martha Marquez
 Alvaro Rodríguez as Salvador

References

External links
 

2011 films
2010s Spanish-language films
2010s mystery drama films
Colombian drama films
2011 drama films
2010s Colombian films